Polyalthia fragrans is a plant in the Annonaceae family. Its leaves have a fragrant smell. It is called Gowrimara in Kannada. It is found in forests of the Western Ghats of India.

References

External links

fragrans